The 2013 BC Lions season was the 56th season for the team in the Canadian Football League and their 60th overall. On September 27, the Lions defeated the Winnipeg Blue Bombers to clinch a playoff spot for the 17th straight season, tying the mark for the third longest playoff streak in CFL history. The Lions finished the season in 3rd place in the West Division with an 11–7 record, but lost to the Saskatchewan Roughriders in the West Semi-Final.

Offseason

Free agents

CFL Draft
The 2013 CFL Draft took place on May 6, 2013. The Lions had seven selections in the draft, including three positions higher in rounds two and three after completing trades with Edmonton.

Preseason

 Games played with white uniforms.

Regular season

Standings

Schedule

 Games played with colour uniforms.
 Games played with white uniforms.
 Games played with alternate uniforms.

Team

Roster

Coaching staff

Playoffs

Schedule

 Games played with white uniforms.

West Semi-Final

References

BC Lions seasons
BC Lions
2013 in British Columbia